James Murray Mason (November 3, 1798April 28, 1871) was an American lawyer and politician. He served as senator from Virginia, having previously represented Frederick County, Virginia, in the Virginia House of Delegates.

A grandson of George Mason, Mason strongly supported slavery as well as Virginia's secession as the American Civil War began. As chairman of the United States Senate Committee on Foreign Relations from 1851 until his expulsion in 1861 for supporting the Confederate States of America, Mason took great interest in protecting American cotton exporters. As the Confederacy's leading diplomat, he traveled to Europe seeking support, but proved unable to get the United Kingdom to recognize the Confederacy as a country. As Mason sailed to England in November 1861, the U.S. Navy captured his ship and detained him, in what became known as the Trent Affair. Released after two months, Mason continued his voyage, and assisted Confederate purchases from Britain and Europe but failed to achieve their diplomatic involvement. As the war ended, Mason went into exile in Canada, but later returned to Alexandria, Virginia, where he died in 1871.

Early life
Mason was born on Analostan Island, now Theodore Roosevelt Island, then in the District of Columbia (now connecting to Arlington, Virginia). He graduated from the University of Pennsylvania (1818), then studied law in Williamsburg, Virginia and earned a law degree from the College of William & Mary (1820).

Political career
Following admission to the Virginia bar, Mason practiced law in Virginia, and also operated a plantation in Frederick County. Despite a sloppy and damaged census record, he may have owned 5 slaves in the 1830 census. In the 1850 federal census, Mason owned ten enslaved people, half of them children under ten years of age. In that year, he (or another man of similar name) also owned a 25 year old Black woman and her four children in nearby Rappahannock County. In the 1860 census, Mason owned a 49 year old Black man, 35 year old Black woman, and children aged 14, 13, 12, 10 and 3 years old. and he or another James M. Mason owned seven enslaved children (the oldest a 13-year-old girl) in southern Culpeper County. 
 
Mason soon began his political career, well before his father's death, winning election several times as one of Frederick County's (part-time) representatives in the Virginia House of Delegates. His first term began on December 4, 1826, alongside one-term veteran James Ship, but only Ship won re-election the following year. In 1828, Ship failed to win re-election and Mason won the election to represent the gateway to the Shenandoah Valley together with William Castleman, Jr., and both won re-election the following year. After veteran legislator Hierome L. Opie, one of the four joint delegates of Frederick and neighboring Jefferson County to the Virginia Constitutional Convention of 1829-1830, resigned, Mason took his place alongside John R. Cooke, congressman Alfred H. Powell and fellow delegate Thomas Griggs Jr. Although some had hoped that convention would limit slaveholder power, the resulting constitution only gave additional votes to western Virginians (including those in Frederick County and those counties which would secede and become West Virginia during the American Civil War), so Mason and Castleman were re-elected and joined by William Wood for the 1830-1831 legislative session.

In 1836, Congressman Edward Lucas of Shepherdstown (in what would become West Virginia decades later) announced his retirement. Voters in Virginia's 15th congressional district elected Mason as his successor in the Twenty-fifth United States Congress. The Jackson Democrat only served a single term, succeeded by Lucas' brother William Lucas.

In 1847, Virginia legislators elected Mason to the Senate after incumbent Isaac S. Pennybacker died in office, and Mason won re-election in 1850 and 1856. Mason famously read aloud the dying Senator John C. Calhoun's final speech to the Senate, on March 4, 1850, which warned of the likely breakup of the country if the North did not permanently accept the existence of slavery in the South, as well as its expansion into the Western territories. Mason also complained of Northern personal liberty laws, intended to help fugitive slaves: "Although the loss of property is felt, the loss of honor is felt still more."

Mason was President pro tempore of the Senate in 1857.

Champion of slavery
Mason "championed the Southern political platform", "and slavery, another of the three themes that most affected his life, lay at the core of that political ideology." (The other two themes were the secession of Virginia and the establishment of the Confederacy.)

Mason was not only a white supremacist, he believed that negroes were "the great curse of the country". Giving Blacks the vote particularly offended him; it was, he thought, the rule of the mob and the "end of the republic."

He so believed in the beneficence of slavery that, unlike many others in Frederick County, Mason refused to support the colonization project that led to the founding of Liberia. Mason's solution to the "problem" of free blacks was returning them to slavery, stating they were better off enslaved in the United States than they could possibly be in Africa. Mason believed that slavery did not need to be established or require a law to make it legal; it had already been established by God, as recorded in the Bible. It already existed in Africa: "The negro is as much property in Africa as the bullock or the ox". His position was that Congress had no authority to prohibit slavery anywhere, and certainly not in Kansas. Slavery was a condition, not an institution, by which he meant that Americans were not enslaving Africans, they were merely purchasing them from other Africans that had already enslaved them.

Mason wrote the Fugitive Slave Law of 1850, arguably the most hated and openly-evaded Federal legislation in U.S. history. The whole idea of using "popular sovereignty" as a means to expand slavery into the Western territories, starting with Kansas, leading to the Kansas-Nebraska Act and the violence of the Bleeding Kansas period, was hatched in Mason's Washington boarding house. Mason also was the chair of the ad-hoc Senate committee that investigated John Brown's raid on Harpers Ferry, and wrote its report, informally known as the Mason Report.

Secession advocate
Continuing the tradition of his mentor John C. Calhoun, whose last speech (1850) Mason read to the Senate when Calhoun was too sick to do so himself, Mason strongly believed states had the right to secede. Furthermore, the North's intolerance of their "peculiar institution", their "property rights" (the right to own human beings), left them no other choice than secession. He said he didn't need reasons to leave the Union, he needed a reason to stay in the Union.

Mason strongly favored the South's "immediate, absolute, and eternal separation" if anti-slavery, Republican candidate John C. Frémont were elected president in 1856.

In 1861 Mason worked behind the scenes to enable Virginia's secession, remaining in the Senate because he could get information useful for the seceding states, a type of spy behind enemy lines. He and Virginia's other Senator, Robert Hunter, told the commissioners of the new Confederate states that Virginia would join the secession if Jefferson Davis were elected president of a Southern confederacy, but not if it were pro-slavery Alabama Fire-Eater William L. Yancey, seen in Virginia as extreme. Davis was chosen as president three days later.

Mason disappears from Senate activities in March. He and other Southern senators were expelled from the Senate on July 11, 1861, by a vote of 32 to 10, because "they were engaged in a conspiracy for the destruction of the Union and Government, or, with full knowledge of said conspiracy, had failed to advise the Government of its progress or aid in its suppression."

Confederate diplomat
Mason became one of Virginia's representatives to the Provisional Confederate Congress from February 1861 through February 1862. However, his legislative duties were interrupted by a diplomatic assignment. While Mason sailed toward England as a Confederate envoy to Britain on the British mail steamer RMS Trent, the ship was stopped by USS San Jacinto on November 8, 1861. Mason and fellow Confederate diplomat John Slidell were confined in Fort Warren in Boston Harbor. The Trent Affair threatened to bring Britain into open war with the United States, despite triumphant rhetoric in the north. Even the cool-headed Lincoln was swept along in the celebratory spirit, but enthusiasm waned when he and his cabinet studied the likely consequences of a war with Britain. After careful diplomatic exchanges, they admitted that the capture was contrary to maritime law and that private citizens could not be classified as "enemy despatches". Slidell and Mason were released, and war was averted. The two diplomats set sail for England again on January 1, 1862.

Mason represented the Confederacy in England, bringing up Union blockades and unsuccessfully seeking diplomatic recognition for the Confederacy. After Britain issued its refusal in 1863, he moved to Paris, continuing his unsuccessful search for a nation that would recognize or assist the Confederacy. He was there until April 1865.

Later life

When the Union army took over Winchester in 1862, at first "Selma", Mason's house, was requisitioned for regimental offices. (Other Virginia houses named Selma are in Eastville and Leesburg, Virginia.) The lower officers probably did not know who Mason was. But General Banks, formerly a congressman and then governor of Massachusetts, certainly knew. Learning of Mason's pro-slavery activism and his authorship of the hated Fugitive Slave Act, the soldiers, on their own initiative, set about destroying Selma. The roof came off first. Sometime later the walls were pulled down and everything burnable was chopped into firewood. They were so thorough that "from turret to foundation stone, not one stone remains upon another; the negro houses, the out-buildings [there was an ice house], the fences are all gone, and even the trees are many of them girdled". According to Mason, the house was "obliterated". He never lived in Winchester again.

From 1865 until 1868 Mason lived in exile in Canada. (In 2008 the house alone sold for over $8,000,000.) He brought white servants from Canada, and went to some trouble to find others, as he did not want to hire any blacks; he believed free blacks to be "worse than worthless". He died at Clarens in 1871, and was interred in the churchyard of Christ Church (Alexandria, Virginia). His death was not noted by anyone outside his family.

Family

Marriage and children
Mason married Eliza Margaretta Chew (1798–1874) on 25 July 1822 at Cliveden in Germantown, Pennsylvania. The couple had eight children:

Anna Maria Mason Ambler (31 January 1825 – 17 August 1863)
Benjamin Chew Mason (1826–1847)
Catharine Chew Mason Dorsey (24 March 1828 – 28 April 1893)
George Mason (16 April 1830 – 3 February 1895)
Virginia Mason (12 December 1833 – 11 October 1920)
Eliza Ida Oswald Mason (10 August 1836 – 16 December 1885)
James Murray Mason, Jr. (24 August 1839 – 10 January 1923)
John A. Mason (17 November 1841 – 6 June 1925)

He was a grandson of George Mason (1725–1792); nephew of George Mason V (1753–1796); grandnephew of Thomson Mason (1733–1785); first cousin once removed of Stevens Thomson Mason (1760–1803) and John Thomson Mason (1765–1824); son of John Mason (1766–1849) and Anna Maria Murray Mason (1776–1857); first cousin of Thomson Francis Mason (1785–1838), George Mason VI (1786–1834), and Richard Barnes Mason (1797–1850); second cousin of Armistead Thomson Mason (1787–1819), John Thomson Mason (1787–1850), and John Thomson Mason, Jr. (1815–1873); second cousin once removed of Stevens Thomson Mason (1811–1843); and first cousin thrice removed of Charles O'Conor Goolrick.

Sister Sarah Maria was the wife of Confederate general Adjutant Samuel Cooper (general).
Sister Anna Maria was the wife of Sydney Smith Lee-son of Henry "Light Horse Harry" Lee; they were the parents of Confederate Major General and Virginia Governor Fitzhugh Lee.
Brother John T. married Catherine Macomb, daughter of Gen. Alexander Macomb, Jr., Commanding General of the army (1828-1841).

Assessments by political opponents 
One perspective comes from Republican politician Carl Schurz. His visit to Washington coincided with debate over the Kansas-Nebraska Act.

A leading Republican Senator Charles Sumner commented:

See also
 List of United States senators expelled or censured

References

Further reading
 

 Owsley, Frank Lawrence. King Cotton Diplomacy, Foreign Relations of the Confederate States of America (University of Chicago Press. Chicago, 1931).

External links

|-

|-

|-

|-

|-

|-

1798 births
1871 deaths
19th-century American Episcopalians
American Civil War prisoners of war
American expatriates in Canada
American people of Scottish descent
American proslavery activists
American slave owners
Burials at Old Christ Church Episcopal Cemetery (Alexandria, Virginia)
Chairmen of the Senate Committee on Foreign Relations
Confederate expatriates
Confederate States of America diplomats
Democratic Party members of the United States House of Representatives from Virginia
Democratic Party United States senators from Virginia
Expelled United States senators
Foreign relations during the American Civil War
John Brown's raid on Harpers Ferry
Lawyers from Alexandria, Virginia
Mason family
Democratic Party members of the Virginia House of Delegates
Politicians from Alexandria, Virginia
People from Washington, D.C.
People of Virginia in the American Civil War
Politicians from Winchester, Virginia
Presidents pro tempore of the United States Senate
University of Pennsylvania alumni
Virginia lawyers
William & Mary Law School alumni
United States senators who owned slaves